Leroy "Irish" Haley Jr. (December 27, 1952 – November 1, 2018) was an American light welterweight boxer.

Early life 
Born in Garland County, Arkansas, he was the fourth child of Leroy Haley Sr. and Bobbie Wallace-Haley. Haley moved to Las Vegas, where in 1971 he graduated from Rancho High School.

Professional career 
Haley turned professional in 1973 and captured the WBC light welterweight title with a split decision win over Saoul Mamby in 1982. He defended the belt twice before losing it to Bruce Curry by decision the following year.  He lost a split decision in a rematch later that year.  He retired in 1985 after two consecutive losses, including a loss to champion Billy Costello.

References

External links 
 
 
 
 Billy Costello vs. Leroy Haley
 "'Irish' Leroy Haley". UPI. October 20, 1982.
 "You Bet Don't Pick a Fight with This Dealer". St Louis Post-Dispatch. September 11, 1997.

1952 births
2018 deaths
American male boxers
World boxing champions
World light-welterweight boxing champions
Boxers from Arkansas
People from Garland County, Arkansas
American people of African descent
American people of Irish descent